San Giovanni Evangelista is a church in Parma, northern Italy, part of a complex also including a Benedictine convent and grocery.

History
Works for the abbey and church were started in the 10th century over a pre-existing oratory associated with St. Colombanus. In 1477 the whole complex was damaged by a fire.

The abbey basilica was rebuilt from around 1490, with the present design by Bernardino Zaccagni dating from 1510. The construction ended around 1519. The design included since the beginning a thoroughly painting decoration of the interior, and a contract had been signed with the young Correggio, who a had already worked in another Benedictine monastery, in the Camera della Badessa of San Paolo.

Correggio executed five frescoes groups. The first includes the lunette with St. John and the Eagle (c. 1520), followed by the dome, with the Ascension of Christ and the drum and the four pendentives decoration. The third work was the decoration of the vault and the apse ceiling of the Cappella Maggiore, partially destroyed in 1586 when the choir was prolonged: today the central fragment with the Coronation of the Virgin (now at the Galleria nazionale di Parma) has survived. The fourth intervention was in the choir's walls, which were totally destroyed during its reconstruction. Finally, Correggio added a painted frieze which runs for the whole internal perimeter. Preparatory drawings show that also the parts executed by his pupils were designed by Correggio, such as the candelabra in the presbytery's vault and the puttos on the cross-vaults.

Around 1524, Correggio also painted two canvasses in the Del Bono Chapel, now at the Galleria nazionale di Parma: the Lamentation for Dead Christ and the Martyrdom of Four Saints.

Description

The marble façade of the church was designed by Simone Moschino in proto-Baroque style in 1604, and completed in 1607. The bell tower on the right side, perhaps designed by Giovanni Battista Magnani, was completed in 1613. With a height of 75 meters, it is the tallest in Parma.

Interior

The interior is on the Latin cross plan, with a nave and two aisles covered with cross vaults, and a dome at the crossing. The structure is similar to the nearby cathedral's. The grooved piers are Renaissance elements of classical inspiration. In the nave is a frieze by Correggio and his workshop (c. 1522–1524). Is ia long strip with monochrome paintings (with few red details) on a dark blue background, including also some tondoes with portraits of Benedictine popes, cardinals and monks. The main feature is a series of puttos in actions symbolizing the importance of the Christian mess and sacrifice. The grotesque decorations on the semi-piers and the vault decoration (with candelabra, puttos and symbols of St. John the Evangelist) were also from Correggio's pupils, in particular Michelangelo Anselmi (c. 1520).

The left nave has a baptismal font whose base is a c. 1st century AD Roman funerary monument. The twelve side chapels were frescoes by local artists (including Angelo Michele Colonna) in the late 16th century and early 17th century. The first chapel on the left has an arch frescoed by Parmigianino, with St. Agatha and the Executioner and Sts. Stephen and Lawrence. These are monumental figures influenced by Pordenone's frescoes in the Cathedral of Cremona. Another Sts. Stephen and Lawrence and a Saint Vitalis with the Horse, both by Parmigianino, are in the following chapel. Attributed to Parmigianino, but today considered by Anselmi, is a fresco cycle in the Zancheri Chapel, whose altarpiece is by Girolamo Mazzola Bedoli (Mystical Marriage of St. Catherine of Alexandria, 1536). Anselmi also painted a Christ Carrying the Cross (c. 1522) in the sixth left chapel.

Works in the right chapels include an Cristoforo Caselli's Adoration of the Magi (1449, third chapel), Mazzola Bedoli's altarpiece of Madonna with Child and St. James (c. 1543–1545, fourth chapel), and 18th century copies of Correggio's canvasses in the Del Bono Chapel, whose arch has maintained frescoes executed by his pupils under his design (Conversion of St. Paul and Saints Andrew and Peter). The ceiling of the left crossing was painted by Anselmi with a St. Benedict Enthroned and Four Saints (1521), while the walls show terracotta sculptures by Antonio Begarelli (St. John the Evangelist and Madonna with Child and St. John, c. 1543).  In the arch of the right chapel of the presbytery are additional frescoes by Bedoli.

The right apse has ceiling frescoes of Stories of the Life of St. John of Parma by Anselmi. The altarpiece with the Miracle of Sy. John was painted by Emilio Taruffi (1674). At the walls are two groups by Begarelli, portraying St. Felicita with Saint Vitalis and St. Benedict. The presbytery has grotesque decorations attributed to Correggio, while the puttos were added around 1588 by Innocenzo Martini; a fresco from 1587  replicates the original by Correggio, of which only the central part remains, now at the Galleria Nazionale di Parma. The altarpiece is a Transfiguration by Bedoli (c. 1556). The carved wooden choir is from 1513 to 1538. The portal leading to the sacristy has a fresco by Correggio in the lunette, depicting St. John and the Eagle and generally considered his first work in the church, although similarities with the dome decoration could imply that it dates from a later period. The inscription ALTIUS CAETERIS DEI PATEFECIT ARCAN around the painting refers to the nocturnal prayers of the monks. The sacristy was frescoed in 1508 by Cesare Cesariano.

Monastery
The monastery has three cloisters. The first has Ionic columns, the second has decorations by Correggio and the third, known as Cloister of St. Benedict, has early 16th-century frescoes.

The associated library has manuscript and codexes testifying the amanuensis activity of the local monks. The manuscripts arrived here from the monastery of Santa Giustina in Padua without decorations, and here were decorated by Damiano da Moile, Francino da Moile and, starting from 1492, da Michele da Genova.

The monastery has also an ancient grocery, documented since 1201. Its dependences include the Abbey of Santa Maria della Neve at Torrechiara.

References

Roman Catholic churches completed in 1519
16th-century Roman Catholic church buildings in Italy
Giovanni Evangelista
Renaissance architecture in Parma
Giovanni Evangelista Parma
Paintings by Correggio